Peter McMullen (born 11 May 1942) is a British mathematician, a professor emeritus of mathematics at University College London.

Education and career
McMullen earned bachelor's and master's degrees from Trinity College, Cambridge, and studied at the University of Birmingham, where he received his doctorate in 1968. and taught at Western Washington University from 1968 to 1969. In 1978 he earned his Doctor of Science at University College London where he still works as a professor emeritus. In 2006 he was accepted as a corresponding member of the Austrian Academy of Sciences.

Contributions
McMullen is known for his work in polyhedral combinatorics and discrete geometry, and in particular for proving what was then called the upper bound conjecture and now is the upper bound theorem. This result states that cyclic polytopes have the maximum possible number of faces among all polytopes with a given dimension and number of vertices. McMullen also formulated the g-conjecture, later the g-theorem of Louis Billera, Carl W. Lee, and Richard P. Stanley, characterizing the f-vectors of simplicial spheres.

The McMullen problem is an unsolved question in discrete geometry named after McMullen, concerning the number of points in general position for which a projective transformation into convex position can be guaranteed to exist. It was credited to a private communication from McMullen in a 1972 paper by David G. Larman.

He is also known for his 1960s drawing, by hand, of a 2-dimensional representation of the Gosset polytope 421, the vertices of which form the vectors of the E8 root system.

Awards and honours
McMullen was invited to speak at the 1974 International Congress of Mathematicians in Vancouver; his contribution there had the title Metrical and combinatorial properties of convex polytopes.

He was elected as a foreign member of the Austrian Academy of Sciences in 2006. In 2012 he became an inaugural fellow of the American Mathematical Society.

Selected publications
Research papers
.
.
.

Survey articles
. Updated as "Valuations and dissections" (by McMullen alone) in Handbook of convex geometry (1993), .

Books
.
.

References

1942 births
Living people
20th-century British mathematicians
21st-century British mathematicians
Alumni of Trinity College, Cambridge
Western Washington University faculty
Academics of University College London
Fellows of the American Mathematical Society
Members of the Austrian Academy of Sciences
British geometers